Ronald Coleman may refer to:

 Ronald D. Coleman, American politician
 Ronald S. Coleman, United States Marine Corps lieutenant general
 Ronnie Coleman, American bodybuilder
 Ronnie Coleman (American football)
 Ronald Coleman, American DJ better known as OG Ron C
 Ronald Coleman (basketball), American college basketball coach

See also

 Ronald Colman, English actor